Epistrophus may refer to:
 Epistrophus (Greek mythology), any of several legendary characters
 Epistrophus (weevil), a weevil genus in the tribe Hylobiini
 Epistrophus white morpho (Morpho epistrophus), a butterfly of South America